Andrew Green (born 14 June 1965) is a British Formula One engineer. He is currently the chief technical officer at the Aston Martin Formula One team.

Biography
Green began his career in motorsport when he was involved in the newly formed Jordan Grand Prix team in 1990.

Spending many years as a Race Engineer with Jordan in the mid-1990s, he joined British American Racing in 1998 where he was Head of Mechanical Design, later joining Red Bull Technology as the Head of R&D in 2004.

By 2010, Green was back at Silverstone, with the team now called Force India, after taking over the technical reins of the teams operation, initially working as Director of Engineering.

In 2011 Green was appointed Technical Director, a role in which he remained until June 2021.

As of 2021 Green was promoted to Chief Technical Officer as part of a reshuffle with Dan Fallows to take his place as technical director.

References

Living people
Formula One designers
British motorsport designers
21st-century British engineers
Force India
Aston Martin in Formula One
Racing Point F1 Team
1965 births